Kozar is a surname. Notable people with the surname include:

Bernie Kosar (born 1963), NFL football quarterback
Heather Kozar (born 1976), American model 
Al Kozar (1921–2007), American baseball player
Alen Kozar (born 1995), Slovenian footballer
John E. Kozar, American Roman Catholic priest